The Altus Chiefs were a minor league baseball team based in Altus, Oklahoma for one season. In 1911, the Chiefs played briefly as members of the Class D level Texas-Oklahoma League, folding during the season. Altus hosted home minor league games at the site of the Kiwanis Ball Park.

History
In 1911, the Altus "Chiefs" became a charter member of the eight–team, Class D level Texas–Oklahoma League.

The Chiefs joined the Bonham Boosters, Ardmore Blues, Cleburne Railroaders, Durant Educators, Gainesville Blue Ribbons, Lawton Medicine Men and Wichita Falls Irish Lads in beginning Texas–Oklahoma League play on April 25, 1911.

The "Chiefs" nickname corresponds to local history. Today, Altus is home to the Museum of the Western Prairie, which has American Indian artifacts.

On July 18, 1911, the were playing under managers Roy Monroe and George Partain when the team folded. The Gainesville and Lawton teams disbanded in June, before Altus, whose folding corresponded with the end of the 1st half of the split–season schedule for the Texas–Oklahoma League.

Altus finished their season with a final record of 31–44, with the Gainesville Blue Ribbons (19–30) and Lawton Medicine Men (17–31) also ending their seasons early. In the final league overall standings, the Wichita Falls Irish Lads (65–38) led the league, followed by the Durant Educators (65–46), Cleburne Railroaders (61–50), Bonham Boosters (54–60) and Ardmore Blues (49–58). Wichita Falls won the 1st half title and Cleburne won the 2nd half title. In the playoffs, Wichita Falls refused to play game 4 after a financial dispute and Cleburne was awarded the championship.

Altus has not hosted another minor league team.

The Ballpark
The Altus Chiefs hosted home games at the site of the Kiwanis Ball Park, with the ballpark having a different name in the era. Today, Kiwanis Park is owned by the Altus School District, with baseball and softball fields in use by youth teams. The park is also called Totland Park today. Kiwanis Park/Totland Park is located at 1000 Hightower Street.

Year–by–year record

Notable alumni
No Altus Chiefs' alumni advanced to the major leagues.
Chiefs player Calvin Bryant was killed in World War I, fighting for the U.S. Army in France on November 11, 1918.

References

External links
Altus - Baseball Reference

Defunct baseball teams in Oklahoma
Baseball teams established in 1911
Baseball teams disestablished in 1911
Jackson County, Oklahoma
Texas–Oklahoma League teams